Diego Casillas (born 20 December 1994) is a Mexican professional footballer who plays as a midfielder for Central Valley Fuego of USL League One.

Casillas signed with USL League One expansion club Central Valley Fuego on January 19, 2022.

References

External links
Profile at CSUSB Athletics

NISA profile

1994 births
Living people
Fresno Fuego players
Fresno FC players
Reno 1868 FC players
Oakland Roots SC players
Central Valley Fuego FC players
USL Championship players
USL League Two players
American soccer players
Association football midfielders
People from Delano, California
Soccer players from California
Cal State San Bernardino Coyotes men's soccer players
Taft Cougars men's soccer players
National Independent Soccer Association players
Los Angeles Force players
People from Porterville, California
Sportspeople from Tulare County, California
Footballers from Michoacán
Mexican footballers
American sportspeople of Mexican descent